Donald Phillips (born May 7, 1951) is an American politician. He is a former member of the Missouri House of Representatives, having served since 2011. He is a member of the Republican party. He resigned in 2018 after being appointed to the Missouri parole board.

References

Living people
Republican Party members of the Missouri House of Representatives
1951 births
21st-century American politicians
Politicians from St. Louis
People from Kimberling City, Missouri